Redeemer Baptist School, commonly known as Redeemer, is a Baptist private school in North Parramatta, Sydney, Australia. It was founded in 1981.

History
The school was founded in 1981 in the context of the Christian Community Schools movement, which began in the mid 1970s. Various Christian schools were set up as people felt there was a need for an alternative to the state school system and established schools as a ministry of a local church congregation. Families in the Redeemer Baptist Church left their jobs in business and education to commence working for the School and Church. Redeemer Baptist Church was influenced by the Episcopal Church of the Redeemer in Houston, United States, from which the church and school take their names.

The School Crest
In 1981, the school was situated on the grounds of St David’s Presbyterian (later St David’s Uniting Church) at Thornleigh. At the centre window of that church was a stained glass featuring the burning bush, which was subsequently given to the School. The stained glass window, now situated in the N F Cannon Library, served as a basis for the crest as a reminder of the school's roots and as an inspiration for the life of faith that the school seeks to foster.

Campuses 
The School has two campuses. The main campus is in North Parramatta. A range of subjects and extra-curricular activities is offered for all students from pre-kindergarten to Year 12, including vocational education options in the Senior School. The School also has a vocational campus, the historic Castle Hill House at Castle Hill.

North Parramatta 
The main campus is located on 10 hectares of parklands in North Parramatta, about 30 km from the centre of Sydney. This campus is bounded by James Ruse Drive, Pennant Hills Road and Masons Drive. The campus is located on property formerly owned by Sir James Burns who founded the Burnside Presbyterian Homes in 1910 on land which has now become the campus of a number of education institutions including Redeemer Baptist School, The King's School, Tara Anglican School for Girls, Burnside Public School, Garfield Barwick School for hearing-impaired children, Alan Walker College of Evangelism, and Uniting Theological College.

The staff of the School live as a Christian community in the Burnside Gardens Estate in the suburb of Oatlands, a short walking distance from the School's North Parramatta campus. The North Parramatta campus includes: a Science & Technology Centre with science laboratories, food and textiles technology facilities, computer and design laboratories, and an industrial technology workshop; the N F Cannon Library; heritage buildings providing homes for each Stage of School education; the Robertson playing fields surrounded by a range of classrooms; a 25-metre swimming pool; and Sargood Hall.

Hills Regional Skills Centre
The predominant building at the Castle Hill campus is Castle Hill House, circa 1844. The Hills Regional Skills Centre is based at the Castle Hill campus and focuses on the delivery of Vocational Education courses from Certificate I to Graduate Certificate level in the Australian Qualifications Framework. The heritage restoration and adaptive re-use of Castle Hill House was a ministry of Redeemer Baptist Church, involving in excess of 120,000 volunteer hours. The quality of the restoration project was recognised with NSW Master Builders Association awards. The assistance of a couple of Redeemer Baptist Church families provided seed funding for the project.

See also 
 List of non-government schools in New South Wales
Redeemer Baptist Church

References

  NSW Parliament Hansard
  NSW Parliament Hansard
  NSW Parliament Hansard
  NSW Parliament Hansard
  NSW Parliament Hansard
  Australia's Teachers: Australia's Future (Australian Government report, see pages 35–36 of Main Report)
  ABC radio program on Dorothea Mackellar Poetry Prize
  STANSW Young Scientist Awards
  Intel ISEF Excellence Team Award
  BHP Billiton Science Awards
  BHP Billiton Science Awards
  BHP Billiton Science Awards
  BHP Billiton Science Awards
  BHP Billiton Science Awards
  NATA Young Scientist Awards
  STANSW Young Scientist Awards
  STANSW Young Scientist Awards
  STANSW Young Scientist Awards
  STANSW Young Scientist Awards
  STANSW Young Scientist Awards
  STANSW Young Scientist Awards
  STANSW Young Scientist Awards
  Best Australian Science Writing 2012
  Deakin University (especially pages 28–30, 68-70)
  Board of Studies Write On 2013

External links
 Redeemer Baptist School website
  WRAP - A Writing Approach to Reading
  My School Website

Private secondary schools in Sydney
1981 establishments in Australia
Schools in Parramatta
Educational institutions established in 1981
Baptist schools in Australia
North Parramatta, New South Wales